Ola Rui-Lai Wong (born 6 January 1977) is a Swedish author, journalist and sinologist. 

Wong has worked for Svenska Dagbladet, as well as for other media outlets. Wong is of Chinese descent and previously served as a vice-chairman for the Shanghai Foreign Correspondents Club.

Since 2019 Wong is editor for Kvartal.

Career
Since 2002, Wong has been active as a correspondent in China for approximately twelve years, where he was based in Shanghai and Beijing. During his career, Wong has written and published several books and articles on subjects regarding China, such as politics, environment, foreign policy, culture and economics. He is also an expert commentator, who frequently appears in Swedish radio and television.

Personal life
Born to a Chinese father and a Swedish mother, Wong is married and resides in Hägersten, Stockholm.

Bibliography
No, I'm from Borås (2004) – Ordfront
När tusen eldar slickar himlen: Kinas väg till framtiden (2007) – Ordfront
Sjukt billigt – Vem betalar priset för ditt extrapris? (2007) – Norstedts
Blodröda kräftor. Jakten på Henry Wu (2010) – Lind & Co
Pekingsyndromet – Kina, Makten, Pengarna (2014) – Ordfront

Honours
2001 – Föreningen Grävande Journalisters prize – "Grävling" of the Year
2004 – Environmental Journalist of the Year
2007 – Swedish Red Cross journalism prize (shared with Jörgen Huitfeldt and Thella Johnson).
2007 – Stora radiopriset Public service of the Year (shared with Jörgen Huitfeldt and Thella Johnson).
2011 – Guldspaden (shared with Jan Almgren and Jonas Fröberg for the investigation of Invest Sweden).

References

External links
 

1977 births
Living people
People from Borås
Swedish-language writers
Swedish journalists
Swedish sinologists
Swedish people of Chinese descent